Joseph Libbey Folsom (May 19, 1817 – July 19, 1855) was a U.S. Army officer and real estate investor in the early days of California's statehood. He is the founder of what is now Folsom, California. Folsom's controversial purchase of Rancho Rio de los Americanos from the heirs of a San Francisco merchant William Alexander Leidesdorff remained tied up in litigation for many years, eventually reaching the Supreme Court of California after Folsom's death.

Early life
Joseph Folsom was born on Monday, May 19, 1817 in Meredith, New Hampshire. He was the fourth child of Abraham Folsom and Mary Libbey. Descendants of a family that first arrived at Hingham, Massachusetts in the seventeenth century, and subsequently moved on to Exeter, New Hampshire, Abraham Folsom and his wife lived in a home near the northwest corner of Lake Winnipesaukee. Joseph had 5 siblings: Sally T. Folsom, George C. Folsom, Decatur A. Folsom, Charles P. Folsom, and Frank C. Folsom. Abraham Folsom died on Saturday, February 28, 1824, at the age of 46. Joseph was only 6 years old at the time of his father's death.

Early military career
In June 1836, at the age of eighteen, Joseph became a cadet at the Military Academy at West Point. Four years later, in June 1840, he graduated with honors. On November 3, 1840, he held the rank of Second Lieutenant in the 5th infantry of the U.S. Army. He served under the command of General William J. Worth in Florida during the Second Seminole War. In 1844, he returned to the Academy at West Point where he served as an Instructor of infantry tactics for two years.

California
In the Autumn of 1846, Lieutenant Folsom left West Point for California with the First Regiment of New York Volunteers, under the command of Colonel Jonathan D. Stevenson. They sailed for six months before arriving at a port in Yerba Buena (early San Francisco) in March 1847. He was promoted to the rank of Captain and held the position of Staff-officer in the Quartermaster's department. Folsom received orders from General Stephen W. Kearny to inspect San Francisco Bay to select an area for the Army's Military Depot. He was also the first Collector of the Port of San Francisco under American rule from 1847 to 1849.

Folsom invested in real estate by purchasing land owned by William Alexander Leidesdorff from Leidesdorff's mother Anna Maria Spark for $75,000 – a controversial purchase which was mired in litigation for years. Increasing land values in California made Captain Joseph Libbey Folsom a millionaire. In 1854, he chose an area of land near Sacramento, which he named "Granite City". In 1855, Joseph Folsom hired Theodore Dehone Judah, an engineer, to survey the area and map out the town. Folsom chose to name the streets of his town after the names of his friends, family, and other important people in California. He became the second president of the Sacramento Valley Railroad. Joseph Folsom suffered from neuralgia, a painful nerve condition, and had symptoms of pneumonia.  He died suddenly at the age of thirty-eight of renal failure while visiting friends at Mission San José (now Fremont, California) on Thursday, July 19, 1855. In February 1856, the executors of Folsom's estate: Halleck, Peachy, and P. Warren Van Winkle changed the name of Granite City to Folsom, in his honor.

Footnotes

References
Genealogy of the Folsom Family, Rev. Jacob Chapman
A History of Folsom, Daniel Da Vigo
Captain Folsom: Soldier of Misfortune by Debi Drake-Maurer
Folsom Historical Society
California State Library
Stevenson's Regiment: First Regiment of New York Volunteers by Captain Jim Balance
Sacramento County History and Information, My California Genealogy

External links
Guide to the Joseph Libbey Folsom Collection, 1848–1859, Archive of California, California State Library
Joseph Libbey Folsom Collection. Yale Collection of Western Americana, Beinecke Rare Book and Manuscript Library.

1817 births
1855 deaths
People from Meredith, New Hampshire
American pioneers
United States Military Academy alumni
Military personnel from California
Military in the San Francisco Bay Area

People from Folsom, California
People from Merrimack County, New Hampshire
United States Army officers
American military personnel of the Mexican–American War